The year 637 BC was a year of the pre-Julian Roman calendar. In the Roman Empire, it was known as year 117 Ab urbe condita . The denomination 637 BC for this year has been used since the early medieval period, when the Anno Domini calendar era became the prevalent method in Europe for naming years.

Events

Births

Deaths
 Duke Xiang of Song, ruler of the state of Song
 Duke Huai of Jin, ruler of the state of Jin
 Duke Hui of Jin, predecessor to Duke Huai of Jin

References